Denis Donoghue (1 December 1928 – 6 April 2021) was an Irish literary critic. He was the Henry James Chair of English and American Letters at New York University.

Life and career
Donoghue was born at Tullow, County Carlow, into a Roman Catholic family, the youngest of four surviving children. He was brought up in Warrenpoint, County Down, Northern Ireland, where his father, Denis, was sergeant-in-charge of the Royal Ulster Constabulary. His mother was Johanna (O'Neill) Donoghue.

He was educated by the  Irish Christian Brothers at the Abbey Christian Brothers' Grammar School, Newry. He stood 6'7".

He studied Latin and English at University College Dublin, earning a bachelor of arts degree in 1949, an M.A. in 1952, a Ph.D. in 1957, and a D.Litt. (honoris causa) in 1989. He then studied Lieder singing at the Royal Irish Academy of Music. He earned an M.A. at the University of Cambridge in 1964, and returned to Dublin, becoming a professor at UCD. 

In 1980, he was appointed to the Henry James chair of English and American letters at NYU, his final teaching post.

He married Frances Rutledge, formerly a teacher and flight attendant, on 1 December 1951. The couple had eight children. One, Emma Donoghue (born 1969), is an Irish-Canadian novelist, literary historian, teacher, playwright, and radio/film scriptwriter.

On 7 December 2018, aged 90, Donoghue married his longtime partner of more than twenty years, Melissa Malouf, in North Carolina, USA. Malouf
Melissa Malouf (born 1951), previously married to literary critic Frank Lentriccia. Malouf is a writer and retired Duke University professor of English. They resided together in Durham, North Carolina until Denis Donoghue's death at age 92 on 6 April 2021 from natural causes. His first wife, Frances, predeceased him in 2018. He is survived by his second wife Melissa, his children (David, Helen, Hugh, Celia, Mark, Barbara, Stella and Emma) and a large extended family.

Works

The Third Voice: Modern British and American Verse Drama (1959)
The Integrity of Yeats (1964) editor
An Honoured Guest - New Essays on W.B. Yeats (1965) editor with J.R. Mulryne
Connoisseurs of Chaos: Ideas of Order in Modern American Poetry (1965)
The Ordinary Universe: Soundings in Modern Literature (1968) criticism
Swift Revisited (1968) editor, Thomas Davis Lectures, with Roger McHugh, Matthew Hodgart, Mark Kinkead-Weekes, and John Holloway
Emily Dickinson (1969)
Jonathan Swift: A Critical Introduction (1969) editor
Jonathan Swift, Penguin Critical Anthologies (1971) editor
Yeats (Fontana Modern Masters, 1971)
W. B. Yeats, Memoirs (1972) editor
Thieves of Fire (1973) T.S. Eliot Memorial Lectures.
Seven American Poets from MacLeish to Nemerov (1975) essays on John Berryman, Richard Eberhart, Randall Jarrell, Robert Lowell, Archibald MacLeish, Howard Nemerov and Theodore Roethke
The Sovereign Ghost: Studies in Imagination (1976)
Ferocious Alphabets (1981) criticism
The Politics of Modern Criticism (1981)
The Arts Without Mystery (1983) 1982 Reith Lectures
Creation and Interpretation (1984) with William Barrett, Richard Wollheim
R. P. Blackmur, Selected Essays (1986) editor
We Irish : Essays on Irish Literature & Society (1986)
Reading America: Essays on American Literature (1987)
America in Theory (1988) editor with Leslie Berlowitz and Louis Menand
England their England: Commentaries on English Language and Literature (1988)
Warrenpoint (1990) memoirs
The Pure Good Of Theory (1992) Bucknell Lectures in Literary Theory
Who Says What and The Question of Voice (1992) Princess Grace Irish Library Lectures
The Old Moderns,: Essays on Literature and Theory (1994)
Walter Pater: Lover of Strange Souls (1995) biography
Henry James Complete Stories, 1898-1910 (1997) editor
Practice Of Reading (1998)
Words Alone : The Poet T. S. Eliot (2000)
Adam's Curse: Reflections on Religion and Literature (2001)
Speaking of Beauty (2003)
The American Classics (2005)
On Eloquence (2008)
Warrenpoint (2013)
Metaphor (2014)

Broadcasting
In 1982 the BBC invited Donoghue to present its annual Reith Lectures. Across six lectures, called The Arts Without Mystery, he discussed how society's rationalisation of art was destroying its mystery.

References

Sources

1928 births
2021 deaths
Irish writers
Irish literary critics
New York University faculty
Musicians from County Down
Alumni of the Royal Irish Academy of Music
Alumni of University College Dublin
People educated at Abbey Christian Brothers' Grammar School
Musicians from County Carlow
Irish expatriates in the United States
Date of birth missing